"If You Can't Stand the Heat" is a single by UK pop group Bucks Fizz. It was released in November 1982 and became the group's fifth top 10 single in the UK. The song was written by Andy Hill and guitarist Ian Bairnson. It was also produced by Hill.

Background 

Written by Andy Hill and Ian Bairnson and produced by Hill, the song became the group's fifth top 10 single (and seventh consecutive top 20 hit), eventually peaking at No.10 in January 1983. It was certified silver by the BPI for sales of over 250,000 in the UK.

The lyrics of the song tell of someone who is manipulative, but when faced with their own medicine, can't handle it, hence the song's title. The song was a change for the group in that it was their first single where the two female members took the lead vocals on the track - according to the group, this was done due to requests from fans. It has also been noted that the faint reggae beat on the track gives it a slight variation on the group's usually straightforward pop. The song received a positive review from Record Mirror magazine, which complimented the song's production values, calling it “Another truly staggering pseudo-dramatic epic”. It was also well received by Smash Hits which said "Bucks Fizz still know how to make really cultured pop singles" while also complimenting the production.

The promotional video depicts a day in the life of Bucks Fizz, beginning with member Jay Aston oversleeping and then joining the rest of the group for rehearsals, press interviews and culminating in a live performance. The live performance was specially shot for the video at the Shaftesbury Theatre in London, the audience being made up of fan-club members. The video also features their manager Jill Shirley, tour manager Tony McGrogan and fan-club organiser, Gay Purle.

The song featured on the group's third album, Hand Cut, released in 1983, while an extended 12" remix was released in tandem with the 7". The B-side of the single, "Stepping Out" was written and produced by the group themselves. The single came in two different picture sleeves - both with the same photographs, but with different coloured backgrounds - yellow and orange.

An alternate mix of the song appeared on the group's 2005 compilation The Ultimate Anthology.

Track listing 
7" Vinyl
 "If You Can't Stand the Heat" (Andy Hill /Ian Bairnson) (3.35)
 "Stepping Out" (Bucks Fizz) (3.28)

12" Vinyl
 "If You Can't Stand the Heat" (extended) (5.39)
 "Stepping Out" (3.28)

Chart positions

References 

1982 singles
Bucks Fizz songs
Songs written by Andy Hill (composer)
1982 songs
Songs written by Ian Bairnson
RCA Records singles